Alaalatoa or Ala'alatoa, when spelled with Samoan diacritics, is a Samoan surname. Notable people with the name include: 
Vili Alaalatoa (born 1962), Samoan rugby union player
Allan Alaalatoa (born 1994), Australian rugby union player, son of Vili
Harlan Alaalatoa (born 1988), Australian rugby league footballer 
Michael Ala'alatoa (born 1991), Australian rugby union player, brother of Allan

Samoan-language surnames